Isabelle Faust (born 19 March 1972) is a German violinist who has worked internationally as a soloist and chamber musician. She received multiple awards.

Life and career 
Faust was born in Esslingen on 12 March 1972. She received her first violin lessons at the age of five. Her father, then a 31 year old secondary school teacher, decided to learn the violin. He took his young daughter along: the father's talent was not especially stellar, but his infant daughter was able to learn the technical fundamentals of violin playing correctly and at an unusually early age, quickly herself becoming the star pupil. Shortly after that her brother also began to take lessons and when Isabelle was 11 the parents created a family string quartet for which several masterclasses were later organised with some of the leading string players of the time. The early start was, for both the children, the basis for musical careers; Boris Faust has become a viola professional.

She trained with Christoph Poppen and Dénes Zsigmondy. After winning the Paganini Competition, and keen to broaden her experience, she moved in 1996 to Paris where she lived for the next nine years. It was in France that her first CD appeared, featuring music by Bartok. She attracted plaudits as an interpreter of Fauré. Faust later commented ruefully that it probably did no harm to her career that, because of her French first name, many French listeners assumed she was French. It was also in France that she met her husband.

In 2004 she was appointed professor of violin at the Berlin University of the Arts. She lives in Berlin and is the mother of a teenage son. Since 1996, she has performed on the "Sleeping Beauty" Stradivarius violin of 1704, on loan from Landesbank Baden-Württemberg. She has also performed with Baroque-style violins and bows.

Faust has performed as guest soloist with most of the world's major orchestras. In addition to the recordings listed under "Awards and Prizes," she has recorded works of Ludwig van Beethoven, Antonín Dvořák, Robert Schumann, Franz Schubert, Johannes Brahms (including the Violin Concerto), Alban Berg, Bohuslav Martinů, André Jolivet and others. She is a proponent of new music and has given world premieres of works by, among others, Olivier Messiaen, Werner Egk, Péter Eötvös, and Jörg Widmann. James R. Oestreich from The New York Times counted her recording of Mozart's violin concertos among the best recordings of 2016.

Awards and prizes
 1987: International Violin Competition Leopold Mozart in Augsburg, First Prize
 1990: Premio Quadrivio Competition (Rovigo, Italy), First Prize
 1993: Paganini Competition in Genoa, Italy, First Prize 
 1994: 
 1997: Gramophone Award for "Young Artist of the Year" for her first CD, the Sonata for Solo Violin and the Violin Sonata No. 1 of Béla Bartók on Harmonia Mundi
 2002: Cannes Classical Award for her recording for ECM of the Concerto Funèbre of Karl Amadeus Hartmann
 2010: Diapason d'Or de l'Année for her recording of the Sonatas and Partitas for solo violin of Johann Sebastian Bach for Harmonia Mundi 
 2012: Gramophone Award for Best Chamber Recording for her recording of the violin sonatas of Ludwig van Beethoven with pianist Alexander Melnikov for Harmonia Mundi
 2012: Echo Klassik Award for her recording of the violin sonatas of Ludwig van Beethoven with pianist Alexander Melnikov
 2012: Diapason d'Or for her recording of the violin sonatas of Ludwig van Beethoven with pianist Alexander Melnikov
 2017: Gramophone Award for Best Concerto Recording and Recording of the Year for her recording of the violin concertos of Wolfgang Amadeus Mozart with Il Giardino Armonico and Giovanni Antonini

References 

German classical violinists
Living people
1972 births
Academic staff of the Berlin University of the Arts
Paganini Competition prize-winners
Women classical violinists
20th-century German musicians
20th-century classical violinists
21st-century German musicians
21st-century classical musicians
People from Esslingen am Neckar
20th-century women musicians
21st-century women musicians
21st-century classical violinists
20th-century classical musicians
20th-century German women
21st-century German women